{{DISPLAYTITLE:C6H12N4O2}}
The molecular formula C6H12N4O2 (molar mass: 172.18 g/mol, exact mass: 172.0960 u) may refer to:

 Enduracididine
 Tetramethylazodicarboxamide